Jules Vandooren (30 December 1908 – 7 January 1985) was a French footballer who played as a defender.

He played for Olympique Lillois, Red Star FC and Stade de Reims, and was part of France in the 1934 and 1938 World Cups. He then had a long coaching career in France and Belgium.

References

External links

 
 

1908 births
1985 deaths
People from Armentières
French footballers
France international footballers
Ligue 1 players
Olympique Lillois players
Red Star F.C. players
Stade de Reims players
1934 FIFA World Cup players
1938 FIFA World Cup players
French football managers
Cercle Brugge K.S.V. managers
Stade Malherbe Caen managers
Lille OSC managers
Expatriate football managers in Senegal
Senegal national football team managers
CS Sedan Ardennes managers
Stade de Reims managers
US Orléans managers
Tours FC managers
Royal Excel Mouscron managers
K.A.A. Gent managers
French people of Flemish descent
Association football defenders
Sportspeople from Nord (French department)
Footballers from Hauts-de-France
French expatriate sportspeople in Senegal
French expatriate sportspeople in Belgium